The 2020–21 Texas–Rio Grande Valley Vaqueros men's basketball team represented the University of Texas Rio Grande Valley in the 2020–21 NCAA Division I men's basketball season. The Vaqueros played their home games at the UTRGV Fieldhouse in Edinburg, Texas, with three games at Bert Ogden Arena, as members of the Western Athletic Conference. The team was led by fifth-year head coach Lew Hill until his death on February 7, 2021. Four days later, assistant head coach Jai Steadman was announced as the interim head coach.

Previous season
The Vaqueros finished the 2019–20 season 14–16, 9–7 in WAC play to finish in third place. They were set to be the No. 2 seed in the WAC tournament, and face Cal State Bakersfield, however, the tournament was cancelled amid the COVID-19 pandemic.

Roster

Schedule and results 

|-
!colspan=12 style=| Non-conference regular season

|-
!colspan=12 style=| WAC regular season

|-
!colspan=12 style=| WAC tournament
|-

|-

Source

References

UT Rio Grande Valley Vaqueros men's basketball seasons
Texas–Rio Grande Valley Vaqueros
Texas–Rio Grande Valley Vaqueros men's basketball
Texas–Rio Grande Valley Vaqueros men's basketball